Musin, Mussin (masculine; Мусин) or Musina (feminine; Мусина) is a popular Russian and Tatar surname which may refer to:

 Aleksei Musin-Pushkin (1744 — 1817), Russian statesman, historian and art collector
 Apollo Mussin-Pushkin (1760 — 1805), Russian chemist and plant collector
 Aslan Musin (born 1954), Kazakh politician
 Ilya Musin (1903–1999), Russian conductor
 Ilya Musin (born 1991), Russian ice hockey player

Surnames